Self Sacrifice, better known as the Lady Godiva statue is an equestrian statue of Lady Godiva in Broadgate, Coventry. The statue is bronze, on a plinth of Portland stone.

History
The statue was initially commissioned in 1936 by William Bassett-Green, a wealthy local businessman but it was 1940 before a scale model had been produced by the sculptor, Sir William Reid Dick. Reid Dick worked through the Second World War to produce a full scale model of the statue. After the war the statue was cast and placed on a plinth influenced by Sir Edwin Lutyens, before finally being unveiled by Peggy Z. Douglas on the 22nd of October 1949. The statue was adorned with the flags of the United Kingdom and the United States as Mrs Douglas was the wife of the American Ambassador, Lewis Williams Douglas. The statue was initially installed facing south, but was rotated to face west in 1989 during the construction of the Cathedral Lanes Shopping Centre. A canopy was erected over the statue at the same time, which was removed in 2008.

Design
The statue depicts Lady Godiva on her naked ride through the city to protest her husband’s oppressive taxes. The plinth is inscribed with passages from Alfred, Lord Tennyson's poem Godiva along with a dedication from William Bassett-Green to Lady Godiva and the people of Coventry.

Inscriptions

See also
Grade II* listed buildings in Coventry
List of equestrian statues in the United Kingdom

References

Buildings and structures in Coventry
Equestrian statues in the United Kingdom
Statues in the United Kingdom
Adaptations of works by Alfred, Lord Tennyson
Lady Godiva